Chrysaster is a genus of moths in the family Gracillariidae.

Species
Chrysaster hagicola Kumata, 1961
Chrysaster ostensackenella (Fitch, 1859)

External links
Chrysaster Kumata, 1961. Global Taxonomic Database of Gracillariidae (Lepidoptera)

Lithocolletinae
Gracillarioidea genera

Taxa named by Tosio Kumata